Rūdolfs Reinhards Baumanis (14 August 1909 – 15 May 1998) was a Latvian sports shooter. He competed in the 50 m rifle event at the 1936 Summer Olympics.

References

External links
 

1909 births
1998 deaths
Latvian male sport shooters
Olympic shooters of Latvia
Shooters at the 1936 Summer Olympics
Place of birth missing